King George Square busway station is located in Brisbane, Queensland, Australia serving the Brisbane central business district. It is located beneath King George Square and marks the start of the Northern Busway. The station has twelve stops on two platforms; access to these platforms is via an underground concourse which can be accessed from Ann Street or Adelaide Street. Passengers wait behind automatic doors on the stop that is assigned to their bus. It opened on 19 May 2008.

Construction

Construction of the King George Square busway station was announced in March 2005. Construction commenced in early 2006 and the station opened on 19 May 2008 when the Northern Busway was extended from Normanby. The lower two levels of the King George Square Car Park were demolished to make way for the station. The heritage-listed Wheat Creek Culvert (built in 1861) which ran from under King George Square out into Adelaide Street was also demolished. A short segment of the culvert has been preserved as a display in the bus station.

A bus tunnel has been constructed under Albert Street to link the station with Queen Street bus station. The bus tunnel replaced one of the tunnel exit ramps to the Queen Street station on Albert Street (see photo below). As part of construction, the space in Albert Street above the new tunnel has been converted into a pedestrian mall extending the Queen Street Mall.

In conjunction with the building of the station, there was a national design competition for the redevelopment of King George Square. The winning entry was entitled A Space in Transition by UrbisJHD. Construction of the Square was completed in October 2009. The re-design of the square and its busway entrances attracted criticism from professional urban designers and the public.

In 2021 a tunnel was dug from the busway station to Adelaide Street for the Brisbane Metro project.

Facilities
King George Square busway station has 12 stops on two platforms (6 stops each labelled 1A-1F and 2A-2F). Passengers wait behind automatic doors at allocated stops rather than hailing buses. Passengers enter the station from either Ann or Adelaide Streets and then select the desired platform via an underground concourse at each end.

The station also features a bike station, cycle2city, located on the Ann Street Concourse. However, bicycles are not allowed on the station's platforms.

When the station originally opened, it included a Transport Information Centre at the Ann Street entrance, this however was closed on 29 September 2012.

Services
King George Square busway station primarily services routes travelling to the Northern and Western Suburbs (departing from Platform 1). A small number of routes travelling to Southern and Eastern Suburbs via the South East Busway depart from Platform 2.

Connection to Queen Street
No Northern Busway services directly connect King George Square station with the Queen Street bus station. After stopping at King George Square (Platform 2), a number of inbound (southbound) services bypass Queen Street and stop or terminate at the Cultural Centre on the southern side of the Brisbane River, and vice versa. However, King George Square and the Queen Street are only a short walking distance apart.

Peak Hour Services
Following successful trials as other busway stations, Translink has introduced a peak hour prepaid restriction in order to improve efficiency of buses departing from the station. During the evening peak passengers must use a go card or pre-purchase tickets from operators located on the Ann Street and Adelaide Street concourses prior to boarding buses.

Gallery

References

External links

[ King George Square station] TransLink

Brisbane central business district
Bus stations in Brisbane
Transport infrastructure completed in 2008